Jeffrey Lee Francis (born July 7, 1966) is a former American football quarterback. He was drafted by the Los Angeles Raiders in the 1989 NFL Draft and also played for the Cleveland Browns. He played college football at Tennessee.

Early years
Francis attended Prospect High School in Mount Prospect, Illinois.

College career
Francis played quarterback for Johnny Majors at the University of Tennessee from 1985 to 1988, starting from 1987 to 1988. He was the starting quarterback for Tennessee in the 1988 Peach Bowl, which the Volunteers won 27–22 over the Indiana Hoosiers. He was Tennessee's all-time leader in pass completions and passing yards at the time of his graduation.

Collegiate statistics

Professional career

Los Angeles Raiders
Francis was drafted by the Los Angeles Raiders in the sixth round of the 1989 NFL Draft and spent his rookie season on the Raiders' development roster. He was waived by the Raiders on September 4, 1990.

Cleveland Browns
On October 11, he was signed by the Cleveland Browns and placed on the practice squad. Francis was activated by the Browns before their December 23 game against the Pittsburgh Steelers. He appeared in that game, completing two passes for 26 yards.

Francis spent the 1991 season on injured reserve and was cut by the Browns on August 25, 1992. He was re-signed by Cleveland on September 23 when backup Todd Philcox went on the injured reserve. He was again waived by the Browns on October 1.

Indianapolis Colts
On November 18, 1992, the Indianapolis Colts signed Francis to their practice roster. He was waived on December 9, 1992.

Personal life
Francis spent time as sideline reporter for the Vol Network starting in 2007. He resigned from the job to spend more time with his family, including coaching his sons’ football teams. In addition, he now is senior vice president and financial consultant with Pinnacle Asset Management.

References

1966 births
Living people
American football quarterbacks
Cleveland Browns players
Los Angeles Raiders players
Tennessee Volunteers football players
Sportspeople from Park Ridge, Illinois
Players of American football from Illinois